New Smyrna Beach High School (NSBHS) is a public high school located in New Smyrna Beach, Florida, United States.

About
The school mascot is the Barracuda, commonly referred to as the "Cuda."

The high school opened in 1963 on what is now called Barracuda Boulevard. In the fall of 2006 NSBHS opened their new location, approximately 3 miles from the old school, at 1015 10th Street, just down the road from New Smyrna Beach Middle School.

The school has been named a Blue Ribbon School of Excellence.

The annual yearbook is known as The Smyrnan.

Academics
Currently ranked as an "A" school by the state of Florida, NSBHS offers AP (Advanced Placement), AICE Cambridge, and Honors classes, as well as the AVID program.  The school offers specialized academies in numerous areas:
 Culinary Academy
 Engineering and Design Academy
 Medical Academy
 Early Education Academy
 Criminal Justice Academy

Activities
The school offers various activities, such as academic team, the Barracuda Band, drama, International Thespian Society troupe 1903, art, spirit club, class steering committees, photography, Key Club, FFA, HOSA, SGA, Spanish club, French club, Cuda Care, Beta Club, National Honor Society, Cuda Marketing, Campus Impact, chess club, Model UN, Interact, and the Ahistorical Reenactment Society of Edgewater.

New Smyrna Beach High School is home to the award-winning varsity dance team, the Showdolls. They have won 11 national dance team championships:
 1990 Prop - "Joker's Wild"
 1993 Prop - "Hairspray"
 1994 Prop - "Orient Express"
 1995 Prop - "True Colors"
 1996 Prop - "On Safari"
 1998 Prop - "Vogue"
 1999 High Kick - "Prisoner"
 2000 High Kick - "Electricity"
 2004 Prop - "A Pirate's Life"
 2005 Prop - "Live From Mars"
 2010 High Kick - "Cirque"
 2011 High Kick - "Nerds"

Notable alumni
Sports
 Dallas Baker, CFL professional football player (2001)
 Ed Bennett, NASCAR Chief Administrative Officer, IMSA Chief Executive Officer 
 Wes Chandler, Hall of Fame professional football player (1974)
 D'Cota Dixon, NFL safety for the Tampa Bay Buccaneers 
 Darrell Fullington, former professional football player (1983)
 Eric Geiselman, professional surfer
 Evan Geiselman, professional surfer
 Cole Holcomb, NFL player
 Chris Isaac, former CFL quarterback with the Ottawa Rough Riders (1977)
 Raheem Mostert, NFL running back and kickoff returner for multiple teams (2011)
 Darrynton Evans, NFL running back for the Tennessee Titans
 Dylan DeLucia, 2022 College World Series MVP

Entertainment
 The Beu Sisters, music recording artists
 Alex Kinsey, Season 3 winner of The X Factor

Entrepreneurship
 Adam Lovell, owner of WriteAPrisoner.com

References

 http://ballstatesports.com/ViewArticle.dbml?ATCLID=3669272

External links
 Official school website
 School grades
http://www.city-data.com/school/new-smyrna-beach-high-school-fl.html

High schools in Volusia County, Florida
Public high schools in Florida
Buildings and structures in New Smyrna Beach, Florida
1963 establishments in Florida
Educational institutions established in 1963